Re:ECM is a 2011 album by minimal techno producers Ricardo Villalobos and Max Loderbauer. It uses recordings released on the ECM Records label primarily associated with jazz and contemporary classical music as the basis for the tracks.

Reception 
The album received mostly positive  reviews in specialized medias, while The Guardian, for instance, remains somehow more mixed in its overall favourable comments.

Track listing

Sources 

Ricardo Villalobos albums
2011 remix albums
ECM Records albums